Galahad is a Knight of the Round Table and the son of Lancelot in Arthurian legend.

Galahad can also refer to:

 Duke Galahad, a playable character from Gaiapolis
 Galahad, Alberta, a hamlet in Canada
 Bertha Diener (Helen Diner), intellectual of Austria, who adopted the pseudonym Sir Galahad
 HMS Sir Galahad, several British ships of that name
 Galahad library, a library for nonlinear optimization
 Galahad Threepwood, a character created by P. G. Wodehouse
 Galahad (video game), a 1992 video game for the Sega Mega Drive/Genesis. It is also known as The Legend of Galahad
 Galahad (band), a British progressive rock band
 Sir Galahad (poem) is an 1842 poem by Alfred Tennyson, 1st Baron Tennyson about Sir Galahad and the Holy Grail
 Galahad Knightmare frame in Anime/Manga Code Geass
 Galahad was the official code name for the 5307th Composite Unit, a U.S Army unit of WW2